Palitoy was a British toy company. It manufactured some of the most popular toys in Britain, some original items and others under licence. Its products included Action Man, Action Girl, Action Force, Tiny Tears, Pippa, Tressy, Mainline Model Railways, Merlin, Star Wars figures, Play-Doh and the Care Bears.

History
The Cascelloid Company was founded by Alfred Edward Pallett in Coalville, Leicestershire in 1919 to produce celluloid and fancy goods. Their first toy was in 1920 and the first doll in 1925.

Cascelloid was bought in 1931 by British Xylonite and the word "Palitoy" was created as a trademark in 1935 for their toy division. Injection moulding was developed by British Xylonite in 1941 and was used for the Palitoy toy ranges.

In 1978, the Chad Valley toys company was sold to Palitoy.

Palitoy was sold to US food company General Mills in 1968, and formed part of the company's toy division, sometimes known as CPG Products Corp (Creative Products Group Products Corp).

In 1981, British toy group Airfix Products fell into receivership. Palitoy's owner General Mills acquired the Airfix kit range and its GMR model railways range. General Mills also snapped up UK rights to Meccano. Back in 1971, it had acquired non-UK rights when it bought Meccano in France from the receivers of another British toy group, Tri-ang.

Palitoy effectively ceased to be an independent business in 1984 when its parent company, CPG, part of General Mills, closed its entire design department leaving it effectively just a sales and marketing operation.

In January 1985, General Mills announced it would be quitting the toy business. In the US, its toy business was split into three distinct companies: Kenner (focused on toys), Parker Brothers (focused on games) and Fun Dimensions (focused on crafts, model kits MPC and model trains Lionel). General Mills made the decision to merge Kenner and Parker into one entity and to sell off Fun Dimensions. This decision impacted Palitoy which adopted the Kenner Parker name and withdrew from the model and craft sector to help form one uniform global toy and games company. It sold the Airfix business to Humbrol and a large part of Mainline Railways to Dapol.

On 1 May 1985, most of the work at Palitoy ended with 327 staff in manufacturing and distribution out of 585 made redundant and manufacturing shifted overseas.

The restructure was undertaken in advance of the spin-off of General Mills' toy division CPG, separated from its parent in 1985 as Kenner Parker Toys, Inc. There were many potential acquirers of the business but the subsidiary was floated on the stock exchange with General Mills' shareholders getting equivalent shares in Kenner Parker. This was more tax efficient for General Mills.

In 1987, Tonka purchased Kenner Parker including Palitoy for $555 million, borrowing extensively to fund the acquisition. However, the cost of servicing the debt meant Tonka itself had to find a buyer and it was eventually acquired by Hasbro in 1991.

Hasbro closed the former Palitoy site in 1994  with manufacture of the last product made there, Play-Doh, being transferred to Hasbro's Irish factory. In 2016 fans of the popular Palitoy Action Man toy gathered to celebrate his 50th birthday at the site, and in the following year Palitoy was honoured with a green plaque for helping "stoke children's imaginations" by Leicestershire County Council at Coalville Business Park, which now stands on the site of the former factory.

Toy list
 Action Force
 Revocopter
 Action Man 
 Hi-play-dough
 Star Wars
 Tressy
 Blythe

References

Toy companies of the United Kingdom
Bachmann Industries